The Tyler County Courthouse and Jail in Middlebourne, West Virginia, was built in 1854 to replace an 1829 structure.  The courthouse was extensively renovated and modified in 1922 to a design by E.C.S. Holmboe and a Mr. Pogue of Clarksburg. The redesign created a Classical Revival composition using the structure of the older building.

References

Courthouses on the National Register of Historic Places in West Virginia
Neoclassical architecture in West Virginia
Beaux-Arts architecture in West Virginia
Government buildings completed in 1922
Buildings and structures in Tyler County, West Virginia
County courthouses in West Virginia
County government buildings in West Virginia
Clock towers in West Virginia
National Register of Historic Places in Tyler County, West Virginia